Les Baxter's African Jazz is an album by Les Baxter and His Orchestra. It was released in 1959 on the Capitol label (catalog no. T-1117). The album consists of original music composed by Baxter. Upon its release, the album received a four-star rating from Billboard magazine. Billboard called it an "imaginative package" with "inventive treatments", excellent sound, and "lush, rich approaches."

Track listing
Side 1
 "Congo Train"
 "Elephant Trail"
 "Banana Boy"
 "Safari"
 "Mombasa After Midnight"
 "Rain"

Side 2
 "Lost City"
 "Walkin' Watusi"
 "Ostrich Hunt"
 "Cairo Bazaar"
 "Jungalero"
 "Balinese Bongos"

References

1959 albums
Capitol Records albums
Les Baxter albums